Keratin 6A is one of the 27 different type II keratins expressed in humans. Keratin 6A was the first type II keratin sequence determined. Analysis of the sequence of this keratin together with that of the first type I keratin led to the discovery of the four helical domains in the central rod of keratins. In humans Keratin 6A is encoded by the KRT6A gene.

Keratins 

Keratins are the intermediate filament proteins that form a dense meshwork of filaments throughout the cytoplasm of epithelial cells. Keratins form heteropolymers consisting of a type I and a type II keratin.  Keratins are generally expressed in particular pairs of type I and type II keratin proteins in a tissue-specific and cellular differentiation-specific manner.

The keratin proteins of epithelial tissues are commonly known as "keratins" or are sometimes referred to as "epithelial keratins" or "cytokeratins".  The specialized keratins of hair and nail are known as "hard keratins" or "trichocyte keratins". Trichocytes are the specialized epithelial cells from which hair and nail are composed.  Trichocyte keratins are similar in their gene and protein structure to keratins except that they are especially rich in the sulfur-containing amino acid cysteine, which facilitates chemical cross-linking of the assembled hard keratins to form a more structurally resilient material.

Both epithelial keratins and hard keratins can be further subdivided into type I (acidic) keratins and type II (neutral-basic) keratins.  The genes for the type I keratins are located in a gene cluster on human chromosome 17q, whereas the genes for type II keratins are located in a cluster on human chromosome 12q (the exception being K18, a type I keratin located in the type II gene cluster).

Keratin 6A 

Keratin 6A (protein name K6A; gene name KRT6A), is a type II cytokeratin, one of a number of isoforms of keratin 6 encoded by separate genes located within the type II keratin gene cluster on human chromosome 12q. It is found with keratin 16 and/or keratin 17 in the palm and sole epidermis, the epithelial cells of the nail bed, the filiform papillae of the tongue, the epithelial lining of oral mucosa and esophagus, as well as the hair follicles. This keratin 6 isoform is thought to be the most abundant of the K6 isoforms.

The KRT6A gene consists of 9 exons separated by 8 introns and is located in the type II keratin gene cluster on human chromosome 12q.  Keratin 6B and keratin 6C are encoded by the neighbouring genes, which are identical in intron-exon organization to KRT6A and are more than 99% identical in their DNA coding sequences.

Keratin 6A has been shown to have antimicrobial properties, and is the main antimicrobial factor in the eye.

Genetic disorders 

Mutations in the genes expressing this protein is associated with the PC-K6A subtype of pachyonychia congenita, an inherited disorder of the epithelial tissues in which keratin 6A is expressed, particularly leading to structural abnormalities of the nails, the epidermis of the palms and soles, and oral epithelia.

Immunohistochemistry
The expression of keratin 6A is often tested together with keratin 5, using CK5/6 antibodies, which target both keratin forms.

External links
  GeneReviews/NCBI/NIH/UW entry on Pachyonychia Congenita

References

Keratins